"Pressure" is a 1982 song by American musician Billy Joel released as a single from the album The Nylon Curtain and reached #20 on the US Billboard Hot 100. The synthesizer-driven rock song tells about the pressure of creating and the pressure of being a provider.

Themes and lyrics
In Night School, a show airing on MTV in 1982 that ran roughly a half-hour long, in which he answers questions posed by audience members, Billy Joel reveals that the pressure he was talking about in the song was something along the lines of writing pressure and pressure to provide.

The PBS children's TV series Sesame Street and New York PBS member station WNET ("channel 13") are also mentioned in the first bridge, and the magazine Time is mentioned in the second.

Single and album edits
The single version removes the third verse (starting with "Don't ask for help, you're all alone") and the second bridge. This version of the song was included in the original release of the Greatest Hits I & II compilation album, but the full album version was restored for the remastered edition, as well as the Complete Hits Collection in 1997. Radio stations vary in whether they play the shortened or the full version of the song. The song is written in a minor key. Playing the song on an episode of VH1 Storytellers in 1997, Joel (for humorous effect) modulated the piano melody to a major key, and commented that it sounded like a polka when played that way.

Reception
Cash Box said that "the bass, drums and keyboards at times poke and pound like an annoying headache (appropriately, considering the theme) while sliding into briefly melodic calm at others."  Billboard said that it shows Joel "learned lessons from new music acts while keeping his melodic instincts intact" and specifically commented on the drumming and vocal performance.

Music video
The music video of the song features the full version, instead of the shortened one.  A common motif in the video is the use of water, whether splashed on Joel's shoes, rushing out from school desks, or flooding his apartment. The video was directed by Russell Mulcahy and made its premiere on MTV on September 9, 1982. Several scenes in the video make references to movies such as A Clockwork Orange, Poltergeist and, in the framing sequence, The Parallax View.

Charts

References 

1982 singles
Billy Joel songs
Songs written by Billy Joel
Music videos directed by Russell Mulcahy
Song recordings produced by Phil Ramone
Columbia Records singles
1982 songs